Anita Kaul (née Kripalani;19 September 1954 – 10 October 2016) was an Indian Administrative Service officer best known for her contributions to the Indian education sector. She was a defining voice of the Right to Education movement and one of the principal architects of the Right of Children to Free and Compulsory Education Act, 2009 which made education a fundamental right for every child in India. She is also well-known for her role in expanding the Nali Kali ('joyful learning') approach to primary schools in India. Heralded as one of Karnataka's most 'successful, innovative and revolutionary' reform programs, the pedagogic innovations of Nali Kali during Anita Kaul's tenure have been described as 'little short of a renaissance' in Indian education.

Anita Kaul retired as Secretary, Department of Justice, the highest ranking civil servant in the Ministry of Law and Justice.

Career Highlights

Education

Right to Education Act and National Curriculum Framework: 2006–2012 
The highlight of Anita Kaul's tenure in the Department of School Education was coordinating the passage of the Right to Education Act. Described as a 'harbinger of a new era', the enactment of the Right to Education Act resulted in India becoming the 135th country in the world where education is a fundamental right. Anita Kaul also played a critical role in successfully defending the Right to Education Act before the Supreme Court of India including some of its most contentious provisions – (a) at least 25% from disadvantaged groups are admitted in Class 1 and (b) the "no detention" and "no expulsion" provisions.

In 2005-06, Anita served as Secretary, National Council of Educational Research and Training (NCERT) where she led efforts in the drafting of the National Curriculum Framework 2005 (NCF). The NCF sets out what should be taught to children in India and how. It continues to serve as the statutory framework for syllabus and teaching practices for schools across India.

Education in Karnataka and the Nali Kali reforms: 1996–2000 
In the 1990s, as Project Director of the District Primary Education Programme (DPEP) and Secretary, Department of Education in the Government of Karnataka, Anita played an important role in bringing the Nali Kali (or joyful learning) approach to learning to Karnataka's primary schools. Developed with UNICEF assistance, the Nali Kali strategy adopted creative learning practices in a joyful, affirming, non-threatening environment that helped significantly improve enrollment, particularly of girls, in rural primary schools in Karnataka. Since 2000, the Nali Kali-inspired, joyful learning strategies have expanded to several Indian states, including Tamil Nadu, Rajasthan, Madhya Pradesh, Assam, Jharkhand, Maharashtra and Chhattisgarh. Academic studies have shown that the Nali Kali reforms provided striking insights into how schools can deal more sensitively and effectively with issues of social inequality and exclusion. Heralded as one of Karnataka's most 'successful, innovative and revolutionary' reform programs, the pedagogic innovations of Nali Kali during Anita Kaul's tenure have been described as 'little short of a renaissance' in Indian education.

National Literacy Mission: 1988–1992 
Earlier in her career, Anita served as Director of the National Literacy Mission (1988-1992) where she was instrumental in taking the Total Literacy Campaigns (TLCs) from less than ten districts to almost 100 districts across India. Started in Ernakulam district in 1989, the 'TLC model' of mass literacy constituted the principal strategy of eradicating illiteracy in India during the 1990s.

Other career highlights 
A large part of Anita's work centered around empowering women. During her tenure in the Department of School Education, she strengthened the Mahila Samakhya programme which sought to enhance self-esteem and self-confidence of women to enable them to make informed choices in areas like education and employment. Similarly, as Director, Women and Child Development in the Government of Karnataka (1993-1995) and Director General of the State Institute of Rural Development (2002-2006), Anita conceptualized and implemented training programs that were large-scale, participatory and satellite-based.

Following her retirement from the Indian Administrative Service, Anita joined the Council for Social Development as its Director. She was planned to join the Centre for Equity Studies in New Delhi but died a week before in October 2016.

Anita Kaul Lecture Series 
The Anita Kaul Lecture is an annual lecture organised by the Centre for Equity Studies, Rainbow Foundation India and Mobile Creches in memory of Anita Kaul.

First Anita Kaul Lecture – Education and Inequality in India 
The First Anita Kaul Lecture was delivered on 15 October 2017 by Professor Krishna Kumar, former Director of the National Council of Educational Research and Training (NCERT) and chaired by Professor Shanta Sinha, former Chairperson of National Commission for Protection of Child Rights, Government of India.

Second Anita Kaul Lecture –  Realizing the Right to Education for All: At the Altar of the Courts or in the Hands of the People 
The Second Anita Kaul Lecture was delivered on 13 October 2018 by Professor Amita Dhanda, Professor of Law, Nalsar University of Law, Hyderabad and chaired by Aruna Roy, Founder, Mazdoor Kisan Shakti Sangathan.

Third Anita Kaul Lecture – Reaffirming Hope: Transformative Education for Equity and Empathy 
The Third Anita Kaul Lecture was delivered on 2 November 2019 by Professor Anita Rampal, Former Dean, Faculty of Education, University of Delhi and chaired by Anshu Vaish, former Secretary, Department of School Education and Literacy, Government of India.

Fourth Anita Kaul Lecture – Challenges to India's Democracy and the Role of the Indian Media 
The Fourth Anita Kaul Lecture was delivered on 23 October 2021 by Pamela Philipose, senior journalist and Ombudsperson, The Wire and chaired by Dr. Harish Khare, former media advisor to the Prime Minister of India and former Editor-in-Chief of The Tribune.

Further reading 
Anita Kaul's career is profiled in the chapter 'Power of the People' in Women of Influence: Ten Extraordinary IAS Careers written by Rajni Sekhri Sibal and published by Penguin in 2021.

See also 
 Right of Children to Free and Compulsory Education Act
 Literacy in India
 Education in India
Ministry of Human Resource Development
Indian Administrative Service

References 

Women educators from Karnataka
1954 births
2016 deaths
Indian Administrative Service officers
Indian government officials
21st-century Indian educators
20th-century Indian educational theorists
20th-century Indian women politicians
20th-century Indian politicians
21st-century Indian women politicians
21st-century Indian politicians
Educators from Karnataka
Women in Karnataka politics
20th-century women educators
21st-century women educators